Brendan Nasser (born 6 June 1964 in Brisbane) is a former Australian international rugby union player.
He played as a flanker and was capped 8 times for Australia between 1989 and 1991.
He was a member of the winning Australian squad at the 1991 Rugby World Cup.

Career
Brendan Nasser was another player who graduated from one of the nurseries of Australian Rugby – St Joseph's College, Gregory Terrace. Even in his schooldays, and particularly when a member of the first fifteen, Brendan Nasser had the reputation of being a very powerful number eight, with exceptional skills and strength. He was a very effective player when involved in moves from the base of the scrum and was almost unstoppable when close to the try-line.

From the earliest of his playing days, it was evident to everyone that some day he would join the ranks of the Wallabies,

He played 45 games for Queensland as a flanker or a number eight and from there progressed to his first of nine Test caps, and seven non-Test matches, in 1989.

His first Test was at Strasbourg in France' where he joined Jason Little, Peter FitzSimons and Rod McCall as Wallabies on debut. He formed part of a formidable and very skilful Australian pack.

Nasser's representative career continued for the next two years and during that time he played five Tests against France, both home and away, and also in the 1990 Test against New Zealand at Eden Park.

This was a Test won by the All Blacks 27–17, with Australia taking it to their opponents and playing well in all phases of the game.

It was a game in which Nasser had not expected to play. He had returned to Australia earlier on in the tour with a suspected broken cheek-bone, but was recalled when medical tests showed that not to be the case. He justified his selection with a performance of exceptional rugby.

Unfortunately in the next Test which was played in Wellington and which was won by Australia, who played brilliant rugby despite the weather conditions which were extremely windy and wet, Nasser was forced to withdraw before kick-off due to an injury.

In all games in which Brendan Nasser played he earned a reputation for being a skilful, clever and fair player.

Opposing teams were always very wary of him when set pieces were close to the try-line or when he took the ball at the end of the line-out.

He was always a popular member of the team and his fellow players regarded him as an excellent team man who gave 100 percent in anything he attempted.

Brendan Nasser enjoys a very successful career as a Dental Surgeon and had no problems in achieving a happy balance between his playing career and his University studies. He went on to Oxford University for post-graduate studies where he had the distinction of being awarded a 'Blue' in the annual 'Varsity match, another feather in what was a long and successful rugby career.

References

External links
ESPN Profile

1964 births
Living people
Australian rugby union players
Australia international rugby union players
Australian people of Lebanese descent
Rugby union flankers
Rugby union players from Brisbane